Steel First was a junior steel roller coaster located at Dorney Park & Wildwater Kingdom in South Whitehall Township, Pennsylvania. Manufactured by the Allan Herschell Company, the ride opened to the public in 1985.

The coaster was originally located in East Dundee, IL at Santa's Village, where it was known as Snowball Express. It was removed in 1985 and placed in storage, until it was bought and moved to Dorney Park.  Maximum rider height was 34". It was originally named the Colossus Junior & Little Laser, but its name was changed to Steel First for the 2009 season after the removal of another roller coaster at the park known as Laser. Steel First operated until the 2010 season and has since been removed.

Roller coasters operated by Cedar Fair
Former roller coasters in Pennsylvania